Hoseynabad-e Shah Nazar (also Romanized as Ḩoseynābād-e Shāh Naz̧ar; also known as Ḩoseynābād) is a village in Zeynabad Rural District, Shal District, Buin Zahra County, Qazvin Province, Iran. At the 2006 census, its population was 286, in 53 families.

References 

Populated places in Buin Zahra County